Barakamon is a Japanese shōnen manga series written and illustrated by Satsuki Yoshino. The story follows Seishū Handa, a calligrapher who is sent to the remote Gotō Islands off the western coast of Kyūshū, and his various interactions with the people of the island.

Barakamon began serialization in Square Enix's Gangan Online February 2009 issue. The first tankōbon volume was released on July 22, 2009; The series was licensed by Yen Press in February 2014, who released the first volume on October 28, 2014.

A spin-off manga, titled Handa-kun, started serialization in Square Enix's Monthly Shonen Gangan magazine starting in the November 2013 issue. It takes place six years prior to Barakamon, focusing on Seishū's life as a high school student. The first tankōbon volume was released June 21, 2014; seven volumes have been released as of September 12, 2016.

Volume List

Barakamon

|}

Handa-kun

|}

References

Barakamon